Martial Law 2: Undercover (also known as Karate Cop and Martial Law II) is a 1991 martial arts film written by Richard Brandes and Jiles Fitzgerald, produced by Steve Cohen, directed by Kurt Anderson and stars Jeff Wincott, Cynthia Rothrock, Paul Johansson, L. Charles Taylor, Sherrie Rose, and Billy Drago. It is also the sequel to the 1990 film Martial Law.

Plot
Investigating the mysterious death of a colleague, LAPD cops Sean Thompson, who is now a detective (and played by Jeff Wincott), and Billie Blake begin to uncover a deadly ring of murder and corruption. Their search leads to a nightclub, where the rich and powerful are entertained by a stable of beautiful girls and protected by martial arts experts hired by a ruthless crime lord. When Thompson is called off the investigation by his commander, Billie goes undercover and infiltrates the ring on her own; soon, both are facing impossible odds in a climactic battle.

Release
The film made its world debut at the American Film Market in October 1991, but would eventually be released in the United States only on home video. In the Philippines, where Rothrock was already an A-list star, the film opened in early January 1992, exhibited in Manila theaters as a "super roadshow presentation". The film would be released on videocassette in August 1992 by MCA/Universal Home Video. The film was released on DVD in Europe, by Bellevue Entertainment. It is part of a movie package that also contains Savate, Martial Law and Mission of Justice. The film has been released on Blu-ray in the United States by Vinegar Syndrome.

Cast

 Jeff Wincott as Detective Sean Thompson
 Cynthia Rothrock as Billie Blake
 Paul Johansson as Spencer Hamilton
 Evan Lurie as Tanner
 Charles Taylor as Dobbs (as L. Charles Taylor)
 Sherrie Rose as Bree
 Billy Drago as Captain Krantz
 Deborah Drigg as Tiffany
 Conroy Gedeon as Jones
 Kimber Sisson as Celeste
 Leo Lee as Han
 Max Thayer as Captain Banks
 John Vidor as Sonny
 Nicholas Hill as Jorge
 Dagny Hultgreen as Kristine Richards
 Ken Duncan as Brad Hamilton
 Lou Palumbo as Al Murphy
 Pat Asanti as George
 Oscar Dillon as Jones Bodyguard #1
 Rico McClinton as Jones Bodyguard #2
 Addison Cook as Bob (as Addison Cook Porter IV)
 Bridget Carney as Flash Dancer
 Michael Anthony Taylor Talking Cop (as Michael-Anthony Taylor)
 Gregg Brazzel as Bo
 Jeffrey Scott Jensen as Plainclothes #1
 Christopher Ursitti as Cop #1
 Denice Duff as Nancy Borelli (as Denice Marie Duff)
 Lumpy Strathmore as Officer Dickens
 Matthew Powers Rick
 Lou Voiler as Dude
 Fritz Lieber as Lenny

External links

References

1991 films
1991 martial arts films
American martial arts films
American sequel films
Fictional portrayals of the Los Angeles Police Department
Films directed by Kurt Anderson
1990s American films